There are twenty-four municipalities within the boundaries of Sussex County in the state of New Jersey. These include one municipality incorporated as a town, eight incorporated as boroughs, and fifteen incorporated as townships, organized in accordance with state law. In 2010 Federal decennial census, 149,265 persons resided in Sussex County, a gain of 3.5% from the 144,166 persons counted in the 2000 Federal decennial census. Populations, as of 2010, range from the county's largest municipality, Vernon Township, with 23,943 residents, to Walpack Township, with 16 residents.

When Sussex County was created on June 8, 1753 from the northern and western regions of Morris County it consisted of the land area of present-day Sussex County and Warren County (created in 1824) in northwestern New Jersey. In 1753, Sussex County consisted of four large "precincts": Walpack (created c. 1731), Greenwich (created c. 1738), Hardwick (created 1750), and Newtown (created 1751, dissolved 1864). These four precincts would be divided to create the 24 municipalities presently extant in Sussex County and 22 municipalities presently extant in Warren County. 

By a legislative act on November 20, 1824, Warren County was created of the southern half of Sussex County divided on by partition line "beginning on the river Delaware, at the mouth of Flat brook, in the township of Walpack, and running from thence, a straight course to the corner of the Hardwick church [now in Yellow Frame], situated on the south side of the main road leading from Johnsonsburg to Newton and from thence in the same course to the middle of Muskonetcong creek". This line divided Hardwick Township with its lands north of the line being ceded to create the townships of Green and Stillwater. The line also divided Walpack Township with the lands south of the line being ceded to create Pahaquarry Township in Warren County.

Another line of partition, the Lawrence Line of 1743, is still extant in the boundaries of four Sussex County municipalities. This line was drawn by surveyor John Lawrence to provide final resolution after 67 years of disputes to the division of New Jersey into the two proprietary colonies of the Province of West Jersey and Province of East Jersey in accordance with the Quintipartite Deed (1676), divided the state in a straight line from "the Northernmost Branch of said Bay or River of De la Ware which is in forty-one Degrees and forty minutes of latitude...unto the most southwardly poynt of the East syde of Little Egge Harbour". This line divides Walpack Township from Sandyston Township, and Stillwater Township from Hampton Township.

List of municipalities

Defunct municipalities

See also
 List of census-designated places in New Jersey
 List of municipalities in New Jersey

References

Notes

Citations

External links
 County of Sussex (official website)

Sussex County, New Jersey